Frederick Joseph Dore (4 September 1903 – 28 August 1984) was an  Australian rules footballer who played with St Kilda in the Victorian Football League (VFL).

Notes

External links 

1903 births
1984 deaths
Australian rules footballers from Victoria (Australia)
St Kilda Football Club players
Prahran Football Club players